Szelegiewicziidae is an extinct family of aphids in the order Hemiptera. There are about 6 genera and 10 described species in Szelegiewicziidae.

Genera
These six genera belong to the family Szelegiewicziidae:
 † Brimaphis Wegierek, 1989 Dzun-Bain Formation, Mongolia, Aptian, Zaza Formation, Russia, Aptian
 † Feroorbis Wegierek & Huang, 2017 Burmese amber, Myanmar, Cenomanian
 † Sepiaphis Wegierek, 1989 Dzun-Bain Formation, Mongolia, Aptian
 † Szelegiewiczia Shaposhnikov, 1985 Zaza Formation, Russia, Aptian
 † Tinaphis Wegierek, 1989 Itat Formation, Russia, Bajocian/Bathonian, Sharteg, Mongolia, Tithonian, Zaza Formation, Russia, Aptian
 † Xenoaphis Wegierek, 1989 Zaza Formation, Russia, Aptian

References

Sternorrhyncha
Prehistoric insect families